Colombian people of note include:

Actors

Jorge Enrique Abello (born 1968)
Carolina Acevedo (born 1979)
Julián Arango (born 1968)
Yancey Arias (born 1971)
Víctor Hugo Cabrera (born 1968)
Manolo Cardona (born 1977)
Margalida Castro (born 1943)
Angie Cepeda (born 1974)
Catalina Denis (born 1985) 
Robinson Díaz (born 1978) 
María Elena Döehring (born 1962)
Juan Pablo Espinosa (born 1980)
Margarita Rosa de Francisco (born 1965) 
Isabella Gomez (born 1998)
Juan Pablo Gamboa (born 1966)
Paula Garcés (born 1974)
Aura Cristina Geithner (born 1967)
Fabian Rios  (born 1980)
Carla Giraldo (born 1986)
Amparo Grisales (born 1956)
Teresa Gutiérrez (1928–2010)
Zulay Henao (born 1979)
Vicky Hernández (born 1945)
Ana María Kamper (born 1964)
John Leguizamo (born 1964)
Luis Mesa (born 1968)
Ana María Orozco (born 1973)
Juan Pablo Raba (born 1977)
Catalina Sandino Moreno (born 1981)
Isabella Santo Domingo (born 1967)
Juan Pablo Shuk (born 1965)
Paola Turbay (born 1970)
Miguel Varoni (born 1964)
Sofía Vergara (born 1972)
María Fernanda Yépez (born 1980)

Architects

Daniel Bermúdez Samper (born 1950)
Rafael Esguerra (1922–2000)
Raúl Fajardo Moreno (1929–2012)
Giancarlo Mazzanti (born 1963)
Rogelio Salmona (1929–2007)
Simón Vélez (born 1949)

Artists

Ricardo Acevedo Bernal (1867–1930), painter.
Rodrigo Arenas Betancur (1919–1995), sculptor.
Fernando Botero Angulo (born 1932), painter and sculptor.
Miguel Gómez (born 1974), photographer.
Pedro Nel Gómez Agudelo (1889–1989), muralist.
Enrique Grau Araújo (1920–2004), painter.
Santiago Martínez Delgado (1906–1954), muralist.
Leo Matiz (1917–1998), photographer.
Édgar Negret Dueñas (1920–2012), sculptor.
Alejandro Obregón Roses (1920–1992), painter.
Mario Opazo (born 1969), video and production artist 
Andrés de Santa María Hurtado (1860–1945), painter.
Silvia Tcherassi Solano (born 1965), fashion designer.

Fernando Montaño (born 1985), ballet dancer and choreographer.

Broadcasters

Carlos Cabrera (born 1959)
Jorge Barón (born 1948)
Félix de Bedout (born 1964)
Ilia Calderón (born 1972)
Silvia Corzo (born 1973)
Natalia Cruz (born 1976)
Abel González Chávez (1943–2019)
Juan Gossaín (born 1949)
Fernando González Pacheco (1932–2014)
Alfonso Lizarazo (born 1940)
María Lucía Fernández (born 1968)
Patricia Janiot (born 1963)
Hernán Orjuela (born 1957)
Claudia Palacios (born 1977)
Julio Sánchez Cristo (born 1958)
Manuel Teodoro (born 1963)
Gloria Valencia (1927–2011)
Jota Mario Valencia (1956-2019)
Inés María Zabaraín (born 1969)

Businesspeople

Carlos Ardila Lülle (1930–2021)
Fuad Ricardo Char Abdala (born 1937)
Gustavo Adolfo Carvajal Sinisterra (born 1961)
Carlos Cardona (born 1974)
Luis Fernando Correa Bahamon (born 1955)
Carlos Cure (born 1944)
Alfonso Davila Ortiz (1922–2015) 
James Martin Eder (1838–1921)
German Efromovich  (born 1950)
Gustavo Gaviria Angel (born 1948)
Jaime Gilinski Bacal (born 1957)
Isaac Gilinski Sragowicz (born 1934)
Luis Fernando Jaramillo Correa (1935–2011) 
Mario Laserna Pinzon (1923–2013)
Paulo Laserna (born 1953)
Isaac Lee Possin (born 1971)
Astrid Medina (born 1977), coffee producer
Luis Alberto Moreno (born 1953)
Guillermo París Sanz de Santamaría (1820–1867)
Aurelio París Sanz de Santamaría (1829–1899)
Julio Mario Santo Domingo Braga (1958–2009)
Alejandro Santo Domingo Dávila (born 1977)
Julio Mario Santo Domingo Pumarejo (1923–2011)
Luis Carlos Sarmiento Angulo (born 1933)
Alexander Torrenegra (born 1978)
Carlos Ignacio Urrea Arbelaez  (born 1966)
Joaquín Vallejo Arbeláez (1912–2005)
Eduardo Verano de la Rosa (born 1950)

Community organizers

John Henry González Duque (born 1966)

Criminals

Griselda Blanco Restrepo (1943–2012)
Daniel Camargo Barbosa (1936–1994)
Campo Elías Delgado Morales (1934–1986)
Pablo Escobar Gaviria (1949–1993)
Luis Alfredo Garavito Cubillos (born 1957)
Diego León Montoya Sánchez (born 1958)
Gilberto Rodríguez Orejuela (1939–2022)
Miguel Rodríguez Orejuela (born 1943)
Ana Carreño Parra (born 2004)

Economists

Salvador Camacho Roldán (1827–1900)
Mauricio Cárdenas Santa María (born 1962)
Lauchlin Bernard Currie (1902–1993)
Alejandro Gaviria Uribe (born 1966)
Rudolf Hommes Rodríguez (born 1943)
Adriana Kugler (born 1969)
Maurice Kugler (born 1967)
José Antonio Ocampo Gaviria (born 1952)
Miguel Urrutia Montoya (born 1939)

Filmmakers

Ciro Guerra (born 1981)
Simon Brand (born 1970)
Rodrigo García (born 1959)
Víctor Gaviria (born 1955)
Fernando Vallejo Rendón (born 1942)

Left-wing terrorists

Manuel Marulanda (1930–2008), FARC-EP member.
Vera Grabe Loewenherz (born 1951), former M-19 member.
Camilo Torres Restrepo (1929–1966), ELN member.
Salvatore Mancuso (born 1969), former AUC member.

Historians

Tomás Joaquín de Acosta y Pérez de Guzmán (1800–1852)
Germán Arciniegas Angueyra (1900–1999)
Eduardo Lemaitre Román (1914–1994)
Manuel Uribe Ángel (1822–1904)

Humorists

Andrés López Forero (born 1971)
Pedro González (born 1965)
Jaime Garzón (1960–1999)

Journalists

Yamid Amat (born 1941)
Paulo Laserna Phillips (born 1953)
Fidel Cano Gutiérrez (1854–1919)
Luis Villar Borda (1929–2008)

Military personnel

Custodio García Rovira (1780–1816)
José Hilario López Valdés (1798–1869)
José María Melo y Ortiz (1800–1860)
Mario Montoya Uribe (born 1949)
Tomás Cipriano de Mosquera y Arboleda (1798–1878)
Antonio Nariño y Álvarez (1765–1824)
Freddy Padilla de León (born 1948)
Gabriel París Gordillo (1910–2008)
Gustavo Rojas Pinilla (1900–1975)
Francisco de Paula Santander y Omaña (1792–1840)
Fernando Tapias Stahelin (1943–2015)
Rafael Uribe Uribe (1859–1914)

Models

 
Manuela Arbelaez (born 1988), model for the Price is Right
Ariadna Gutiérrez (born 1993), Miss Colombia 2014
Laura González (born 1995), Miss Colombia 2017
Luz Marina Zuluaga Zuluaga (1938–2015), 1958 Miss Universe.
Paulina Vega (born 1993), 2014–2015 Miss Universe.
María Cristina Díaz-Granados Dangond (born 1986)
Paulina Margarita Gálvez Pineda (born 1980), 1999 Miss International.
Stella Márquez Zawadski (born 1937), 1960 Miss International.
Lina Marulanda Cuartas (1980–2010)
Jeymmy Paola Vargas Gómez (born 1983), 2004 Miss International. 
Andrea Tovar (born 1993), Miss Colombia 2016 
Gabriela Tafur (born 1995), Miss Colombia 2018
Valeria Morales (born 1998), Miss Universe Colombia 2018

Musicians

Rafael Orozco Maestre (1954–1992)
Joe Arroyo (1955–2011)
Cabas (born 1976)
Jorge Celedón (born 1968)
Andrés Cepeda (born 1973)
Diomedes Díaz (1957–2013)
Andrea Echeverri (born 1965)
Rafael Escalona (1926–2009)
Fanny Lú (born 1973)
Fonseca (born 1979)
Pacho Galán (1906–1988)
Juanes (born 1972)
Carolina la O (born 1979)
Jorge Oñate (1949–2021)
Shakira (born 1977)
Soraya (1969–2006)
Totó la Momposina (born 1948)
Lucía Pulido (born 1962)
Kali Uchis (born 1993)
Carlos Vives (born 1961)
Charlie Zaa (born 1974)
J Balvin (born 1985)
Maluma (born 1994)
Crudo Means Raw (born 1988)
Sebastian Yatra
Karol G (born 1991)

Politicians

Ingrid Betancourt Pulecio (born 1961)
Piedad Córdoba Ruiz (born 1955) 
Iván Duque Márquez (born 1976)
Jorge Eliécer Gaitán Ayala (1903–1948)
Luis Carlos Galán Sarmiento (1943–1989)
César Gaviria Trujillo (born 1947)
Antanas Mockus Šivickas (born 1952)
Mario Laserna Pinzon (1923–2013)
Rafael Núñez Moledo (1825–1894)
Mariano Ospina Rodríguez (1851–1885)
Ernesto Samper Pizano (born 1950)
Juan Manuel Santos Calderón (born 1951)
Horacio Serpa Uribe (1943–2020)
Camilo Torres Tenorio (1766–1816)
Guillermo Torres Barrera (died 1988)
Álvaro Uribe Vélez (born 1952)
Cecilia María Vélez (born 1953)
Eduardo Valencia Ospina (born 1940)

Sportspersons

Baseball
Jorge Alfaro 
Yhonathan Barrios 
Lou Castro 
Orlando Cabrera 
Jolbert Cabrera 
Dayán Díaz
Jackie Gutiérrez 
Tayron Guerrero 
Dilson Herrera 
José Quintana - MLB player
Edgar Renteria 
Donovan Solano (born 1987) - Colombian baseball second baseman for the San Francisco Giants
Julio Teherán - MLB player

Basketball
Braian Angola - basketball player

Other
Yuri Alvear Orejuela (born 1986), Olympic judoka 
Egan Bernal (born 1997), Cyclist, winner of the 2019 Tour de France
 Daniel Bluman (born 1990), Colombian-born Israeli Olympic show jumping rider
 Diego Chará - football player
 Yimmi Chará - football player
Orlando Duque (born 1974), high diver
Víctor Aristizábal Posada (born 1971), footballer
Faustino Asprilla Hinestroza (born 1969), footballer
Helmut Bellingrodt Wolff (born 1949), Olympic shooter
Antonio Cervantes Reyes (born 1945), boxer
Alejandro Falla Ramírez (born 1983), tennis player
Radamel Falcao García Zárate (born 1986), footballer
Denis Gomez (born 1991), footballer
David González (born 1990), skateboarder
Marlon González (born 1989), footballer
Boris de Greiff Bernal (1930–2011), chess player
Luis Herrera Herrera (born 1961), cyclist
René Higuita Zapata (born 1966), footballer
Caterine Ibargüen Mena (born 1984), Olympic jumper
Iván Molina (born 1946), tennis player
Juan Pablo Montoya Roldán (born 1975), race car driver, Former Formula One driver for Williams-BMW and McLaren-Mercedes
Óscar Muñoz Oviedo (born 1993), Olympic taekwondo practitioner
Mariana Pajón Londoño (born 1991), Olympic cyclist
Faryd Mondragón Alí, footballer
Nairo Quintana Rojas (born 1990), cyclist
Carlos Alberto Palacio (born 1998), footballer
Jonathan Romero Preciado (born 1986), boxer
Jackeline Rentería Castillo (born 1986), Olympic wrestler
Edgar Rentería Herazo (born 1975), baseballer
Ximena Restrepo Gaviria (born 1969), Olympic sprinter
Diego Salazar Quintero (born 1980), Olympic weightlifter
Rigoberto Urán Urán (born 1987), Olympic cyclist
María José Uribe Durán (born 1990), golfer
María Isabel Urrutia Ocoró (born 1965), Olympic weightlifter
Carlos Valderrama Palacio (born 1961), footballer
James Rodríguez (born 1991), footballer
Camilo Villegas Restrepo (born 1982), golfer
Alonso Zapata Ramírez (born 1958), chess player
Francisco Henríquez de Zubiría (1869–1933), Olympic tug of war competitor for France, first Colombian to be awarded a medal in the Olympic Games

Writers

Juan Álvarez (born 1978)
Porfirio Barba-Jacob (1883–1942)
Rufino José Cuervo Urisarri (1844–1911)
Germán Espinosa Villareal (1938–2007)
Gabriel García Márquez (1927–2014) (One Hundred Years of Solitude, Love in the Time of Cholera)
Marvel Moreno (1939–1995)
León de Greiff Haeusler (1895–1976)
Jorge Isaacs Ferrer (1837–1895)
Álvaro Mutis Jaramillo (1923–2013)
Mario Laserna Pinzón (1923–2013)
Rafael Pombo y Rebolledo (1833–1912)
José Eustasio Rivera Salas (1888–1928)
José Asunción Silva Gómez (1865–1896)

Scientists

Silvia Blair, parasitologist, biologist
Pelayo Correa (born 1927), pathologist
Raúl Cuero Rengifo (born 1948), microbiologist
Arturo Escobar (born 1952), anthropologist
Julio Garavito Armero (1865–1920), astronomer
Salomón Hakim Dow (1922–2011), neurosurgeon
Rodolfo Llinás Riascos (born 1934), neuroscientist
Adriana Ocampo Uria (born 1955), planetary geologist
Guillermo Owen Salazar (born 1938), mathematician
Manuel Elkin Patarroyo Murillo (born 1946), immunologist
Eduardo Posada Flórez (born 1942), physicist
José Manuel Restrepo Vélez (1781–1863), botanist
Ana María Rey Ayala (born 1977), theoretical physicist
Jorge Reynolds Pombo (born 1936), electrical engineer
José Jerónimo Triana Silva (1826–1890), botanist

See also 

Colombian diaspora
Colombian Americans 
Colombian Canadians
Colombians in Uruguay
Afro-Colombians 
White Colombians

References